Maska may refer to:

Maska (2009 film), a Telugu action film
Maska, a 2010 animated film based on Lem's short story The Mask
Maska (2020 film), a Netflix film directed by Neeraj Udhwani
Maska (album), a 1998 album by Greek artist Glykeria
Maska (rapper), member of French rap band Sexion d'Assaut
Maska (Hazara tribe), a tribe of the Hazara people, found in Afghanistan and neighboring countries
 Maska (company), Canadian power transmission product manufacturer, a member of the ABB Group